"Bolingo (Love Is in the Air)" is a song recorded by German Eurodance group La Bouche, released in 1996 as a single. It achieved moderate success on the charts in Europe. The song peaked at number 15 in Switzerland and Finland, number 19 in Austria and Denmark, number 23 in Sweden and number 26 in Germany. On the Eurochart Hot 100, it reached number 47 in December 1996. A music video was also produced to promote the single, which was shot in Ibiza, Spain.

Critical reception
In his review of the group's second American album release, S.O.S., Chuck Campbell from Knoxville News Sentinel felt that the duo "have sporadic fun with their silliness", "sliding in a little Latin funk on the otherwise fuzzy "Bolingo"."

Track listing
 12" single, France
"Bolingo (Love Is in the Air)" (Club Mix) – 8:00
"Bolingo (Love Is in the Air)" (Radio Mix) – 4:28
"Bolingo (Love Is in the Air)" (Dub Mix) – 4:40

 CD single, France
"Bolingo (Love Is in the Air)" (Radio Edit) – 3:51
"Bolingo (Love Is in the Air)" (Radio Mix) – 4:30

 CD maxi, Europe
"Bolingo (Love Is in the Air)" (Radio Mix) – 4:28
"Bolingo (Love Is in the Air)" (Club Mix) – 8:00
"Bolingo (Love Is in the Air)" (Dub Mix) – 4:40
"Megamix" ("Sweet Dreams"/"Fallin' in Love"/"Be My Lover"/"I Love to Love") – 3:43

 CD maxi, France
"Bolingo (Love Is in the Air)" (Radio Edit) – 3:51
"Bolingo (Love Is in the Air)" (Club Mix) – 8:00
"Bolingo (Love Is in the Air)" (Dub Mix) – 4:40

Charts

Weekly charts

Year-end charts

References

 

1996 singles
1996 songs
BMG Rights Management singles
English-language German songs
Eurodance songs
La Bouche songs